Angelo Veccia (21 March 1963) is an Italian operatic baritone.

Biography 
Angelo Veccia began his musical studies in the Academy of St Cecilia in Rome, the city of his birth, with his father, tenor Luigi Veccia who won in 1964 the important Spoleto Competition for young singers. After winning the Battistini Competition in 1983 and in 1984 he had his debut as a bass first in the United States of America in the role of Grenvil in La traviata and then as Colline in a production of La bohème which allowed him to sing in many theaters of central Italy. Thanks to a scholarship he continued his studies in New York in the prestigious Juilliard School in the class of Daniel Ferro. As a bass, he debuted many roles, often in English, like, among others, Figaro in Mozart's The Marriage of Figaro, Basilio in Rossini's The Barber of Seville, Raimondo in Lucia di Lammermoor and Don Profondo in the American première of Il viaggio a Reims.

After the discovery and the development of the vocal range of a baritone, in 1988 he had his debut as Silvio in Pagliacci and Belcore in L'elisir d'amore and in 1990 he performed for the first time the role of Figaro in Rossini's opera, character which he interpreted for a long time in Italy and abroad. As a baritone, Veccia began a career which brought him to sing in many halls and theaters of all the world (Teatro alla Scala, Arena di Verona, Concertgebouw in Amsterdam).

His brother is the conductor Simone Veccia], founder of Piccola Orchestra '900 in Rome.

Repertoire

Discography 
 Gluck: Iphigénie en Tauride (Carol Vaness, Thomas Allen, Gösta Winbergh, Giorgio Surian, Riccardo Muti, Orchestra del Teatro alla Scala, 1993) Sony
 Puccini: Tosca (Mirella Freni, Plácido Domingo, Samuel Ramey, Anthony Laciura, Angelo Veccia, Bryn Terfel; Giuseppe Sinopoli, Philharmonia Orchestra, 1992) Deutsche Grammophon

DVD 
 Paisiello: Nina, o sia la pazza per amore (Cecilia Bartoli, Jonas Kaufmann, László Polgár, Juliette Galstian, Angelo Veccia; Ádám Fischer, Zürich Opera House Orchestra, 1998)

References 

1963 births
Living people
Italian operatic baritones
Singers from Rome